Cha kla or Phi Cha kla (ผีจะกละ) is a Thai ghost appearing like a cat or wild cat. Cha kla were believed to be used by  sorcerers for attacking their enemies.

Folk tale 
Cha kla is a kind of Phi Ka (ผีกะ). In the Southern Thai language,"Phi Luang", (ผีล้วง) it means a cat with completely black (but not shiny) fur. The cat's fur runs from back to front and it has blood-red eyes. The cat is a nocturnal animal and is fearful of humans - when it sees a human it runs down its hole. It will dig into the hole and will only emerge at night.  When someone sees or touches it, that person will eventually die.

Similar creatures
Nekomata

References

Mythological felines
Thai ghosts
Cat folklore